Jasper is an unincorporated community in Lane County, Oregon, United States. It is southeast of Springfield on Oregon Route 222, at the confluence of Hills Creek and the Middle Fork Willamette River.

Jasper was the site of a siding of the Southern Pacific Railroad's Cascade Line (now part of the Union Pacific Railroad), which was named for local resident Jasper B. Hills, the son of Cornelius Joel Hills, who settled at the locale in 1846. The Jasper post office was established in 1884.

Jasper State Recreation Site, a state park, is south of Jasper.

Jasper is served by the Pleasant Hill School District.

Demographics

References

External links
Images of covered bridges in the Jasper area from Salem Public Library

Unincorporated communities in Lane County, Oregon
1884 establishments in Oregon
Populated places established in 1884
Populated places on the Willamette River
Unincorporated communities in Oregon